Jesús Imaz Ballesté (born 26 September 1990) is a Spanish professional footballer who plays for Polish club Jagiellonia Białystok as a forward.

Club career
Born in Lleida, Catalonia, Imaz graduated through local UE Lleida's youth system. He made his senior debut on 30 August 2009, coming on as a second-half substitute in a 1–1 home draw against UE Sant Andreu in the Segunda División B.

In the summer of 2011, after Lleida's dissolution, Imaz joined newly formed Lleida Esportiu also in the third division. He was first choice in the following seasons, as the club missed out on promotion two times in the play-offs.

On 12 July 2014, Imaz signed a two-year deal with UE Llagostera, recently promoted to Segunda División. He played his first match as a professional on 23 August, replacing Vallho in the 78th minute of a 2–0 away loss to UD Las Palmas.

Imaz scored his first professional goal on 19 October 2014, but in a 1–4 home defeat against RCD Mallorca. On 11 July 2016, after suffering relegation, he agreed to a one-year contract at UCAM Murcia CF also in division two.

On 27 January 2017, Imaz moved to fellow second tier side Cádiz CF, signing until June 2018. On 31 August, however, he joined a host of compatriots at Wisła Kraków.

Imaz continued in the Polish Ekstraklasa in January 2019, signing a three-and-a-half-year deal with Jagiellonia Białystok.

Career statistics

Honours
Individual
Ekstraklasa Goal of the Season: 2020–21

References

External links

1990 births
Living people
Sportspeople from Lleida
Spanish footballers
Footballers from Catalonia
Association football forwards
Segunda División players
Segunda División B players
UE Lleida players
Lleida Esportiu footballers
UE Costa Brava players
UCAM Murcia CF players
Cádiz CF players
Ekstraklasa players
Wisła Kraków players
Jagiellonia Białystok players
Spanish expatriate footballers
Expatriate footballers in Poland
Spanish expatriate sportspeople in Poland